The 2012 British Academy Scotland Awards, were given by the British Academy of Film and Television Arts (BAFTA), Scotland (also known as BAFTA Scotland, or BAFTA in Scotland), and honoured the best Scottish film, television and animated productions, and video games released between the period of 31 August 2011 – 31 July 2012. Presented on 18 November 2012, the event was presided over by Scottish media personality Edith Bowman at the Radisson Blu Hotel, in Glasgow, Scotland.

The Angels' Share received the most nominations with four, winning two for Best Actor/Actress in a Film and Best Writer, and Up There was nominated for two awards, winning both for Best Feature Film and Best Director. Television series Rab C. Nesbitt and Young James Herriot were given two nominations each, the former of which won an award for Best Actor/Actress in Television. Actor Billy Connolly received the Outstanding Contribution to Television and Film Award, a lifetime achievement award and the highest accolade BAFTA in Scotland can bestow.

Winners and nominees
Winners are listed first and highlighted in boldface; the nominees are listed below alphabetically and not in boldface.

Special awards
Billy Connolly received the Outstanding Contribution to Television and Film Award, a lifetime achievement award, "In recognition of [his] enormous achievements as one of Scotland’s most successful talents." The awards for Special Achievement in 2012 went to Christopher Young, who produced The Inbetweeners Movie (2011), Callum Macrae, for directing the television documentary, Sri Lanka's Killing Fields, and Paul Mcguigan, director of the television series, Sherlock. Stuart Cosgrove was given the Outstanding Contribution To Broadcasting award, and Trisha Biggar collected the award for Outstanding Contribution For Craft.

See also
 65th British Academy Film Awards
 2012 British Academy Television Awards
 2012 British Academy Television Craft Awards
 2012 British Academy Cymru Awards

References

External links
The British Academy of Film and Television Arts, Scotland Official website

2012
British
British
2012 in Scotland
2010s in Glasgow
BAF
BAF
Brit
November 2012 events in the United Kingdom